Joseph Edgard Paschal Chapleau (March 1, 1884 – November 10, 1932) was a professional ice hockey player. He played with the Montreal Canadiens of the National Hockey Association.

References

External links
Ed Chapleau at JustSportsStats

1884 births
1932 deaths
Canadian ice hockey players
Montreal Canadiens (NHA) players
Ice hockey people from Montreal